Hara is a public art work by American artist Deborah Butterfield located at the Lynden Sculpture Garden near Milwaukee, Wisconsin.  The sculpture is in the form of horse; it is installed on the lawn.

References

1980s establishments in Wisconsin
1989 sculptures
Bronze sculptures in Wisconsin
Horses in art
Outdoor sculptures in Milwaukee
Statues in Wisconsin